Paul Terzis is an Australian who was the coach of the Leigh Centurions from 1999-2003. His reign was notable for a number of 'near misses' as Leigh attempted to win promotion to Super League. He was succeeded by Darren Abram. He writes for Rugby League World magazine as the 'Supercoach'.

References

Living people
Australian rugby league coaches
Leigh Leopards coaches
Year of birth missing (living people)
Australian people of Greek descent
Australian expatriate sportspeople in England